The Siren's Song is a 1919 American silent drama film directed by J. Gordon Edwards and starring Theda Bara. It is not known whether the film currently survives, and it may be a lost film.

Plot
As described in a film magazine review, Marie Bernais, a Breton village girl, possesses a wonderful voice which her father believes is a gift from the devil. Raoul Nieppe loves her, but fears marrying below his station, and his rejection results in a suicide attempt by Marie. She is rescued by Hector Remey who was once a tenor but is now a Punch and Judy showman. Because of his assistance, she becomes a famous singer. When Raoul finds her, she is the mistress of Gaspard Prevost, a rich merchant who has a wife. Raoul persuades Marie to end the liaison, but she discovers that his anxiety was due to a desire to possess her. Distraught, she persists in singing for soldiers even though she is warned that this would damage her voice. She once again becomes a humble peasant girl. Gaspard, now free due to the death of his wife, seeks her out, and she finds happiness in an honorable marriage.

Cast
 Theda Bara - Marie Bernais 
 Al Fremont - Jules Bernais
 Ruth Handforth - Aunt Caroline 
 Alan Roscoe - Gaspard Prevost
 Lee Shumway - Raoul Nieppe
 Carrie Clark Ward - Paulette Remey
 Paul Weigel - Hector Remey

Influences
The film was referenced in a 1919 song of the same name by Roy Turk and Ray Perkins which mentions Bara by name.

See also
1937 Fox vault fire

References

External links

 
Film still at gettyimages.com

1919 films
1919 romantic drama films
Fox Film films
American romantic drama films
American silent feature films
American black-and-white films
Films directed by J. Gordon Edwards
Lost American films
1910s American films
Silent romantic drama films
Silent American drama films